Tolna complicata is a species of moth of the family Noctuidae first described by Arthur Gardiner Butler in 1880. It is found on Madagascar.

References

Catocalinae
Moths of Madagascar
Moths of Africa